Daniel Pratt (born 21 March 1983) is a former Australian rules footballer who played for both  and  in the Australian Football League (AFL), and a former coach of  in the AFL Women's (AFLW) and West Australian Football League (WAFL) competitions.

Football career 
Pratt was taken at pick 42 in the 2000 National AFL Draft from the Northern Eagles in the AFL Queensland league to the Kangaroos. He did not play a game and was delisted at the end of the 2002 season. Pratt usually plays as a back pocket but can also be deploy as half back flanks or midfield.

Brisbane Lions
Pratt was rookie-listed for 2003 by the Brisbane Lions, a serious hand injury in mid-season required surgery resulting in no further games in 2003. He showed good form and was elevated for 2004. He played three games in 2004 and was not successful. He was subsequently delisted and he nominated for the draft.

North Melbourne 
He did not expect that he would be drafted but the Kangaroos decided to take a punt and draft him at pick 74 for 2005.
He played 17 games in his first season back at the Kangaroos and impressed Dean Laidley. In 2006 he played 18 games but chose to end his season after surgery which would enable him to start pre-season training with the team on 16 October.
Daniel had an outstanding 2007 season gaining some consistency to his game. He ended up playing every game for the Roos and ended up finishing third in the Syd Barker Medal.
Pratt was delisted by North Melbourne on 17 October 2011 possibly due to his form or his age, after playing 119 AFL matches.

Box Hill
With no offers from any AFL club forthcoming, Pratt accepted a two-year contract with the Box Hill Hawks. His onfield leadership saw him appointed co-captain (with Beau Muston) of the VFL team in 2012 and captain in 2013. Unfortunately due to injury he was not able to play in the 2013 Grand Final in which his team won.

Coaching career

West Coast
Daniel Pratt joined  as a development coach in 2014. Pratt filled the void left by Adrian Hickmott who was promoted to a senior assistant role at the Eagles. He was appointed to the dual positions of coach of the West Coast Eagles AFLW team and WAFL men's team for the 2021 seasons. Pratt stepped down as the Eagles' AFLW coach in September 2021.

Playing career controversies

Chicken video scandal
Pratt was the club ringleader (along with teammate Adam Simpson) in a scandal which involved the uploading of a video to YouTube featuring a condom covered rubber chicken's head sexually penetrating a chicken corpse.  In the video, locations inside North Melbourne club rooms and players names were identifiable.  Several groups, including the AFL, the Victorian Women's Trust and National Council of Women of Australia labelled the content of the video highly offensive and sexist to women, treating them as sex objects and openly encouraging of rape.

Rushed behind incident, round 4 2009
Daniel Pratt was the first player to concede a free kick for deliberately rushing a behind in his side's match against . Despite this, the Kangaroos won the match.

References

External links 

 

Australian rules footballers from Queensland
North Melbourne Football Club players
Brisbane Lions players
Box Hill Football Club players
Zillmere Eagles Australian Football Club players
Living people
1983 births
North Ballarat Football Club players